YSR can refer to:

Y. S. Rajasekhara Reddy (1949–2009), former chief minister of Andhra Pradesh, India
YSR Congress Party, a political party in Andhra Pradesh, India, led by Y. S. Jaganmohan Reddy
Kadapa district  (also referred to as YSR Kadapa District), a district in Andhra Pradesh, India
YSR Indoor Stadium, an indoor sporting arena located in the Indian union territory of Yanam
Yamaha YSR50, a miniature motorcycle made by Yamaha
Yuvan Shankar Raja (born 1979), music director
Ystrad Rhondda railway station (National Rail code) in South Wales
Nanisivik Airport (IATA code) in the Canadian territory of Nunavut
AP State Archaeology Museum
the callsign used by Canal 2 in El Salvador, which was formerly branded as that.